K24 may refer to:
 Honda K24 engine
 , a corvette of the Royal Navy
 , a corvette of the Swedish Navy
 K24 TV, a Kenyan television station
 Kurdistan 24, a television station